Yoram Moses is a Professor in the Electrical Engineering Department at the Technion - Israel Institute of Technology.

Yoram Moses received a B.Sc. in mathematics from the Hebrew University of Jerusalem in 1981, and a Ph.D. in Computer Science from Stanford University in 1986. Moses is a co-author of the book Reasoning About Knowledge, and is a winner of the 1997 Gödel Prize in theoretical computer science and the 2009 Dijkstra Prize in Distributed Computing.

His major research interests are distributed systems and reasoning about knowledge.

He is married to the computer scientist Yael Moses.

External links
Yoram Moses's homepage

Electrical engineering academics
Gödel Prize laureates
Dijkstra Prize laureates
Researchers in distributed computing
Hebrew University of Jerusalem alumni
Academic staff of Technion – Israel Institute of Technology
Stanford University alumni
Living people
Year of birth missing (living people)
Israeli electrical engineers